The 2017 IHF World Women's Handball Championship, the 23rd event hosted by the International Handball Federation, was held in Germany from 1 to 17 December 2017. Germany was the only applicant for this championship. Germany was host of the World Championships in 1965 and 1997.

France won their second title after 2003, by defeating reigning champions Norway 23–21 in the final.

Venues
The tournament is being played in the following venues: Bietigheim-Bissingen, Magdeburg, Oldenburg, Leipzig, Trier and Hamburg as the final four venue.

Qualification

Qualified teams

1 Bold indicates champion for that year, Italics indicates host for that year.

Draw
The draw was held on 27 June 2017 at Hamburg, Germany.

Seeding
The seeding was announced on 26 June 2017.

Referees
16 referee pairs were selected:

Squads

Preliminary round
The schedule was announced on 30 June 2017 with the exact throw-off times confirmed on 10 July 2017.

All times are local (UTC+1).

Group A

Group B

Group C

Group D

President's Cup
17th place bracket

21st place bracket

21st–24th place semifinals

17th–20th place semifinals

23rd place game

21st place game

19th place game

17th place game

Knockout stage

Bracket

Round of 16

Quarterfinals

Semifinals

Third place game

Final

Final ranking and statistics

Final ranking

All Star Team
The All Star Team and MVP was announced on 17 December 2017.

Top goalscorers

Top goalkeepers

References

External links
Official website 
IHF website

World Handball Championship tournaments
2017 World Women's Handball Championship
2017 World Women's Handball Championship
Women's handball in Germany
World Women's Handball Championship
December 2017 sports events in Germany
Sport in Trier
Sports competitions in Rhineland-Palatinate
Sports competitions in Hamburg
2010s in Hamburg
2017 in Germany
Sports competitions in Saxony-Anhalt
Sports competitions in Schleswig-Holstein
Sports competitions in Leipzig
Sports competitions in Lower Saxony
21st century in Saxony-Anhalt